Alima pacifica is a species of shrimp in the Squillidae family, and was first described in 2001 by Shane Ahyong.

It is a benthic shrimp and found in tropical waters off Indonesia and Australia.

References

External links
Alima pacifica occurrence data from GBIF

Crustaceans described in 2001
Taxa named by Shane T. Ahyong
Stomatopoda